The Government Polytechnic College, Nagercoil, Tamil Nadu is one of the two polytechnics founded in 1959 under the second five-year plan. It was initially functioning in the South Travancore Hindu College Premises with 120 students. At that time, there were three branches, Civil Engineering, Mechanical Engineering and Electrical & Electronics Engineering. It was then shifted to the present campus spreading over 20 hectares in September 1963. The technical High school was then part of the Government Polytechnic College, Nagercoil institution till the year 1986. At present, the curriculum has expanded into five diploma courses namely Civil, Mechanical, Electrical & Electronics And Electronics and Communication Engineering and Computer Engineering, with an intake of 60 students in each branch together with 20 per cent of students through lateral entry. Besides, part-time diploma courses are part of the institution since the academic year 1978-79.

The institution is approved by AICTE.

Number of students in full-time - 1020
Number of students in part-time - 227

External links
 Officoial website of the college

References

Engineering colleges in Tamil Nadu
Universities and colleges in Kanyakumari district
Education in Nagercoil
Educational institutions established in 1959
1959 establishments in Madras State